A sonic user interface or SUI is a human–machine interface that uses sound as the medium of communication. Unlike a graphical user interface (GUI), the user is only required to speak or make sounds into a microphone or other audio input device and listen for the output on a loudspeaker, headphone set or other audio output device

User interfaces